Jonay Risco (born 25 May 1987 in Spain) is a Spanish kickboxer currently signed with ONE Championship.

He was ranked as a top ten lightweight by Combat Press between June 2018 and July 2021.

Kickboxing career

Early career
Risco fought Andy Souwer during Enfusion 27, and won the fight by close decision after an extra round was fought.

In September 2015, Risco fought the kickboxing legend Sitthichai Sitsongpeenong. He lost by unanimous decision.

Enfusion title reign
Zuev and Risco fought a rematch four months later, during Enfusion 40, for the Enfusion 70kg title. Risco won the rematch by unanimous decision.

He was scheduled to fight the future two weight Enfusion champion Tayfun Ozcan during Enfusion 46. Risco won by TKO, as Tayfun suffered a cut on his shin.

Risco had his first title defense during Enfusion 63, when he was scheduled to fight Buakaw Banchamek. Risco won the fight by decision. He fought Davit Kiria in a non-title bout during Enfusion 66, and won by unanimous decision.

Risco fought in the first round of the Kunlun Fight 70 kg tournament during KLF 75, when he won a unanimous decision against Li Shiyuan. He then defended his Enfusion title for the second time with a decision win over Nordin Ben Moh. Advancing to the KLF tournament quarterfinals, Risco faced Feng Xingli. Xingli won the fight by unanimous decision.

Following this loss, Risco went on a 14 month hiatus from the sport, as he recovered from muscle and ligament injuries in his left leg. Before suffering these injuries, Risco was scheduled to defend his title against Superbon Banchamek.

Risco was scheduled to defend his Enfusion title for the third time in a rematch with Tayfun Ozcan. Ozcan won the fight by unanimous decision.

ONE Championship
In May 2020, Risco signed with ONE Championship.

Titles

 2016 Enfusion -70kg Champion
Two title defenses
 2013 WFCA World -72,5kg Champion

Kickboxing record 

|-  style="background:#fbb;"
| 2019-12-06 || Loss ||align=left| Tayfun Özcan || Enfusion 92 || Abu Dhabi, United Arab Emirates || Decision (Unanimous) || 5 || 3:00
|-
! style=background:white colspan=9 |
|-  style="background:#fbb;"
| 2018-10-14 || Loss ||align=left| Feng Xingli || Kunlun Fight 77 || China || Decision (Unanimous)|| 3 || 3:00
|-  style="background:#cfc;"
| 2018-09-15 || Win ||align=left| Nordin Ben Moh || Enfusion 70 || Belgium || Decision (Unanimous)|| 3 || 3:00
|-
! style=background:white colspan=9 |
|-  style="background:#cfc;"
| 2018-08-05 || Win ||align=left| Li Shiyuan || Kunlun Fight 75 || Sanya, China || Decision (Unanimous)|| 3 || 3:00
|-  style="background:#cfc;"
| 2018-05-05 || Win ||align=left| Davit Kiria || Enfusion Live 66  || Tenerife, Spain || Decision (Unanimous)|| 5 || 3:00
|-  style="background:#cfc;"
| 2018-03-05 || Win ||align=left| Buakaw Banchamek || Enfusion 63 || Abu Dhabi || Decision|| 5 || 3:00
|-
! style=background:white colspan=9 |
|-  style="background:#fbb;"
| 2017-05-20 || Loss ||align=left| Redouan Laarkoubi || Strikers League || Tenerife, Spain || TKO (doctor stoppage) ||  ||
|-  style="background:#fbb;"
| 2017-04-29 || Loss ||align=left|  Yassin Baitar || Enfusion Live #49 || Netherlands || Decision || 3 || 3:00
|-  style="background:#fbb;"
| 2017-03-11 || Loss ||align=left| Davit Kiria || Kunlun Fight 58 70kg Qualifier Tournament 3 Semi-Final B || Rome, Italy || Decision (unanimous) || 3 || 3:00
|-  style="background:#cfc;"
| 2017-02-18 || Win ||align=left| Tayfun Özcan || Enfusion Live 46  || Eindhoven, Netherlands || TKO (Shin Injury) || 2 || 1:21
|-  style="background:#fbb;"
| 2016-11-20 || Loss ||align=left| Mohammed Jaraya || Enfusion Live 43  || Netherlands || Decision || 3 || 3:00
|-  style="background:#fbb;"
| 2016-09-17 || Loss ||align=left| Crice Boussoukou || Enfusion Live 41  || Netherlands || Decision (extra round) || 4 || 3:00
|- style="background:#cfc;"
| 2016-06-04
| Win
| style="text-align:left;"| Dzianis Zuev
| Enfusion Live 40 
| Gran Canaria, Spain
| Decision (Unanimous) 
| 3 
| 3:00 
|-
! style=background:white colspan=9 |
|- style="background:#fbb;"
| 2016-02-21 
| Win 
| style="text-align:left;"| Dzianis Zuev 
| Kunlun Fight 38 70 kg World Max 2016 Group A Tournament Semi-Finals 
| Pattaya, Thailand 
| Decision (Unanimous) 
| 3 
| 3:00
|-  style="background:#fbb;"
| 2016-01-23|| Loss ||align=left|  Anatoly Moiseev || Kunlun Fight 37 || Sanya, China || Decision (Unanimous) || 3 || 3:00
|-  style="background:#cfc;"
| 2015-12-12|| Win ||align=left|  William Diender || Shoot Boxing || Spain || Decision (Unanimous) || 3 || 3:00
|-  style="background:#cfc;"
| 2015-11-07 || Win ||align=left| Christophe Pruvost || Enfusion Live 33  || Switzerland || Decision || 3 || 3:00
|-  style="background:#fbb;"
| 2015-09-28 || Loss ||align=left| Sitthichai Sitsongpeenong || Kunlun Fight 31 - World MAX Tournament 2015 Final 16 || Bangkok, Thailand ||  Decision (unanimous) || 3 || 3:00
|-  style="background:#cfc;"
| 2015-07-19|| Win ||align=left|  Zhao Shuai || Kunlun Fight 28 || Nanjing, China || KO || 2 ||
|-  style="background:#cfc;"
| 2015-07-19|| Win ||align=left|  Maksym Smirnov || Kunlun Fight 28 || Nanjing, China || Decision (Unanimous) || 3 || 3:00
|-  style="background:#cfc;"
| 2015-04-18 || Win ||align=left| Andy Souwer || Enfusion Live 27 || Tenerife, Spain || Decision (Extra Round) || 4 ||
|-  style="background:#fbb;"
| 2015-02-28 || Loss ||align=left| Sergio Sanchez || Top Fight Madrid || Spain || Decision || 3 || 3:00
|-  style="background:#cfc;"
| 2014-12-13 || Win ||align=left| Christopher Mena || GMM Fight Night || Spain || KO ||  ||
|-  style="background:#cfc;"
| 2014-05-10 || Win ||align=left| Dan Balesmao || El Desafio || Spain || KO || 3 || 3:00
|-  style="background:#cfc;"
| 2013-07-13 || Win ||align=left| Arnaldo Silva || Enfusion Live || Tenerife, Spain || Decision || 5 || 3:00
|-
! style=background:white colspan=9 |
|-  style="background:#cfc;"
| 2013-04-13 || Win ||align=left| Elam Ngor || Noche K1 || Tenerife, Spain || Decision || 3 || 3:00
|-  style="background:#cfc;"
| 2012-07-21 || Win ||align=left| Rafa Del Toro || It's Showtime 59 || Spain || Decision || 3 || 3:00
|-  style="background:#fbb;"
| 2012-05-27 || Loss ||align=left| David Calvo || K1 Rising 2012 || Madrid, Spain || Decision || 3 || 3:00
|-  style="background:#fbb;"
| 2012-05-05 || Loss ||align=left| Antonio Gomez Cortes || Lucha de Titanes III || Madrid, Spain || Decision || 3 || 3:00
|-  style="background:#fbb;"
| 2011-11-12 || Loss ||align=left| Andy Ristie || Street Culture, Fight Club Group & Canary Kickboxing Federation presents: It's Showtime 53 || Tenerife, Spain || TKO (left hook) || 3 || 2:30
|-  style="background:#fbb;"
| 2011-06-18 || Loss ||align=left| Naruepol Fairtex || China Fight Night || China || Decision || 3 || 3:00
|-  style="background:#fbb;"
| 2011-01-08 || Loss ||align=left| Warren Stevelmans || K-1 MAX Madrid 2011, Quarter Finals || Madrid, Spain || Decision || 3 || 3:00
|-
| colspan=9 | Legend:

See also 
List of It's Showtime events
List of male kickboxers

References

1987 births
Living people
Spanish male kickboxers
Sportspeople from Santa Cruz de Tenerife
Lightweight kickboxers